Herman Deru (born 17 November 1967) is an Indonesian politician who is the governor of South Sumatra and formerly Regent of East Ogan Komering Ulu.

Born in the town of Belitang, he worked as a civil servant for 11 years before entering politics, becoming a two-term regent for his home regency. After his ten years ended, he participated in the 2018 gubernatorial election and won.

Early life and education
Herman Deru is part of the Komering clan, which is native to areas of South Sumatra. He was born in the town of Belitang in East Ogan Komering Ulu Regency on 17 November 1967. Completing his primary (1979) and junior high school (1982) there, he would later graduate from Palembang State Senior High School 3 (SMA Negeri 3 Palembang) in 1985.

Later, as he worked, he would continue to study law in Sjahyakirti University in Palembang, getting his bachelor's degree in 1995. After he became regent, he would continue to study for his masters as well, obtaining a master's degree in management from Trisna Negara Belitang Economic Institute (STIE Trisna Negara Belitang) in 2008.

Career
After completing his high school, he was briefly self-employed before he became a civil servant in 1987. He would work for the provincial government for 11 years, before he resigned in 1998 and returned to his business.

Regent (2005-2015)
In 2005, he participated in East OKU's first regent election and won. He was sworn in on 23 August 2005. In his first year of tenure, the poverty level was reduced from 12.81 to 10 percent. He was reelected in 2010, winning 94.86 percent of the votes and breaking the national record for the biggest victory in a local election.

During his second term, he tried to run for governor, challenging incumbent Alex Noerdin in the 2013 election. The initial results were challenged and a revote was held. However, he would lose to Noerdin, winning 1,389,169 votes to Noerdin's 1,447,799. His second term ended on 23 August 2015. Within his tenure, he received a total of 29 awards including the Satyalencana Wirakarya medal.

Governor (2018-)

In 2018, Deru decided to run once more for governorship, with Alex Noerdin ineligible for a third term. Backed by PAN, Nasdem and Hanura, him and his running mate Mawardi Yahya won 1,394,438 votes (35.96%), defeating 3 other pairs. He was sworn in on 1 October 2018.

Personal life and family
He married Febrita Lustia in 1985, at the age of 17 as he graduated from high school. Febrita's father, Husni, had served as Mayor of Palembang. The couple has four children.

References

1967 births
Living people
People from South Sumatra
Mayors and regents of places in South Sumatra
Regents of places in Indonesia